Procaterol is an intermediate-acting β2 adrenoreceptor agonist used for the treatment of asthma. It has never been filed for FDA evaluation in the United States, where it is not marketed. The drug is readily oxidized in the presence of moisture and air, making it unsuitable for therapeutic use by inhalation. Pharmaceutical company Parke-Davis/Warner-Lambert researched a stabilizer to prevent oxidation, but an effective one was never developed.

It was patented in 1974 and came into medical use in 1980.

Synthesis
Like pirbuterol, procaterol exhibits similar broncholytic properties as salbutamol (albuterol), but it has somewhat of a more prolonged action. It is recommended for use as an inhaled drug for treating asthma.

8-Hydroxycarbostyril 1 is acylated with 2-bromobutyric acid chloride 2 at the fifth position of the quinoline system, which gives the compound 3. This undergoes action of isopropylamine, forming an aminoketone, the carbonyl group of which is reduced by sodium borohydride, giving procaterol 4.

Names
It is also known as procaterol hydrochloride (USAN).

Procaterol is available under a number of trade names (Onsukil, Masacin, Procadil and others), the most common seems to be Meptin ((KR), (CN), (ID), (MY), (PH), (SG), (TH), (HK)).

References 

Phenylethanolamines
Beta2-adrenergic agonists
2-Quinolones
Quinolinols